Nesse Godin (Galperin) (born 28 March 1928 in Šiauliai, Lithuania) is a Lithuanian American Holocaust survivor. Godin has dedicated her life to informing and teaching others about the Holocaust.

Early years

1933–1939
Godin stated that her life before the war was normal, remarking: "My family was very religious and observed all the Jewish laws. I attended Hebrew school and was raised in a loving household, where the values of community and caring were always stressed. After the Germans invaded Poland in 1939, we heard from relatives in Łódź that Jews there were being treated horribly. We could not believe it; how could your neighbors denounce you and not stand up to help you?" 

When asked why she did not pretend to be German, she recognized she could have, but her neighbor revealed her as a Jew.

1940–1944 
During the years of German occupation in Lithuania, Godin explained:

1945–1950 
From Stutthof, Godin was transported to several camps and was sent on a death march in January 1945. Due to the cold winter weather and inadequate nourishment, many of the prisoners died. On March 10, 1945, she was liberated by Soviet troops. As she was still a young child, she was allocated a random guardian but soon reunited with her mother. Her mother did not recognize her, as it had been three years, and Godin's hair was shaved to treat lice. 

In 1950, after five years in a displaced person camp in Feldafing, Germany, Godin and her husband Jack (also a survivor), along with their two children, Pnina and Edward, moved to the United States and settled in Washington, D.C. metropolitan area.

Later years
In 1954, Godin and Jack had their third and final child, Rochelle. They supported their children and Godin's mother, Sara, with blue-collar jobs.

Godin has seven grandchildren and two great-grandchildren. Jack passed away.

Advocacy/Awareness speaking and volunteering
For over 40 years, Godin has appeared before audiences to speak about the Holocaust to domestic and international audiences. Some organizations and groups she has spoken with include the United States Naval Academy, the United States Military Academy, the Department of Defense, the Department of Energy, the United Nations General Assembly, numerous schools, universities, churches, synagogues, and civic groups.

Godin is a founding member and on boards of several Holocaust Survivor groups. She served on the Jewish Federation of Greater Washington board and is a board member of the Anti-Defamation League, the Jewish Community Council of Greater Washington, and other organizations. Godin is Co-President of the Jewish Holocaust Survivors and Friends of Greater Washington and has served as a speaker for the Capitol Children's Museum of Washington, D.C. 

Godin has earned numerous awards and honors.

Present day
Regarding why she volunteers, Godin stated: 

"As you know I was a prisoner from the age of 13 to 17. I lived through a ghetto, a concentration camp, four labor camps, and a death march. I was not strong, I was not smart, and I was a little girl. I think that I survived the Holocaust by the grace of the Lord above and by the kindness of Jewish women that gave me a bite of bread, wrapped my body in straw to keep me warm, held me up when I was hurt by the guards, gave me hope, but also asked me to promise them that if I survived I would not let them be forgotten. Remember and tell the world what hatred can do. I feel that the USHMM is fulfilling the promise that I made to those women who did not survive. I am proud to be a devoted volunteer in our most wonderful institution of education as I call our USHMM."

References

External links
United States Holocaust Memorial Museum Memory Project - Nesse (Galperin) Godin
Meet United States Holocaust Memorial Museum Survivor Volunteers
Nesse Godin United States Holocaust Memorial Museum ID Card
dcmilitary.com - Holocaust survivor shares memories

1928 births
American people of Lithuanian-Jewish descent
Living people
Lithuanian emigrants to the United States
Lithuanian Jews
Stutthof concentration camp survivors
Nazi-era ghetto inmates
People from Šiauliai